The Burundian Ambassador to Belgium is the official representative of the Government of Burundi to the Government of Belgium.
The Ambassador with residence in City of Brussels is concurrently accredited to the European Commission.

History
from 1916 to 1922 the territory of Ruanda-Urundi was under Belgian military occupation
from 1922 to 1945 the territory of Ruanda-Urundi was  a Belgian-controlled Class B Mandate under the League of Nations.

List of representatives

References 

 
Belgium
Burundi